Buchanan is a surname of Scottish origin (see Clan Buchanan). People with this surname include:

Academia and science
 Alick Buchanan-Smith, Baron Balerno (1898–1984), British academic, soldier and politician
 Allen Buchanan (born 1948), American political scientist and academic
 Andrew Buchanan (surgeon) (1798–1882), Scottish surgeon and academic
 Bill Buchanan (computer scientist) (born 1961), Scottish computer scientist
 Daniel Buchanan (mathematician) (1880–1950), Canadian mathematician
 Francis Buchanan-Hamilton (1762–1829), Scottish surgeon, geographer and naturalist
 George Buchanan (1506–1582), Scottish humanist
 George Wesley Buchanan (1921–2019), American biblical scholar
 Ian Buchanan (philosopher) (born 1969), Australian philosopher
 James M. Buchanan (1919–2013), American Nobel Prize prize-winning economist
 John Buchanan (botanist) (1819–1898), Scottish-born botanist active in New Zealand
 Judith Buchanan (born 1967), British scholar of Shakespeare and film
 June Buchanan (1887–1988), American educator
 Mark Buchanan (born 1961), American physicist and author
 Robert Earle Buchanan (1883–1973), American bacteriologist
 Scott Buchanan (1895–1968), American educator and philosopher

Artists and writers
 Edna Buchanan (born 1939), American journalist and author
 Evelyne Oughtred Buchanan (1883–1979), British artist
 Robert Williams Buchanan (1841–1901), British poet, dramatist, and novelist
 Rowan Hisayo Buchanan (born 1989), American writer
 Ruth Buchanan (born 1980), contemporary New Zealand artist

Military
 Paul Buchanan (born 1956), member of the musical group The Blue Nile
 Allen Buchanan (Medal of Honor) (1876–1940), American Medal of Honor recipient
 Archibald Buchanan (RAF officer) (born 1892, date of death unknown), American World War I flying ace with the British RAF
 David M. Buchanan (1862–1936), United States Navy sailor, recipient of the Medal of Honor
 Franklin Buchanan (1800–1874), American Confederate admiral
 Sir James Buchanan, 2nd Baronet (1840–1901), British Royal Navy officer
 Norman Buchanan (1915–2008), Royal Canadian Army officer awarded the Military Cross with two bars, later a furniture retailer and political figure
 Peter Buchanan (Royal Navy officer) (1925–2011), Royal Navy officer who became Naval Secretary
 Robert C. Buchanan (1811–1878), American soldier

Music
 Bill Buchanan (songwriter) (1930–1996), American songwriter
 Chester and Lester Buchanan, country musicians known as the Buchanan Brothers
 Colin Buchanan (musician) (born 1964), Australian singer, entertainer and multi-instrumentalist
 Georgia Buchanan (born 1990), English singer and songwriter
 Keisha Buchanan (born 1984), British-Jamaican singer
 Manley Augustus Buchanan (born 1949), Jamaican musician
 Michael "HouseShoes" Buchanan, American hip hop producer and DJ, who lives and works in Los Angeles
 Roy Buchanan (1939–1988), American guitarist
 Walter Buchanan (musician) (1914–1988), American jazz bassist

Other
 John Buchanan (Virginia colonist) (died 1769) Colonial Virginia magistrate, landowner, and soldier
 Alan Buchanan (bishop) (1905–1984), Anglican bishop in Ireland
 Sir Andrew Buchanan, 1st Baronet (1807–1882), British diplomat and baronet
 Archibald C. Buchanan (1890–1979), American lawyer and judge
 Blake Buchanan, founder of Bahama Buck's
 Cheryl Buchanan (born 1955), Aboriginal Australian activist, partner of Lionel Fogarty
 Claudius Buchanan (1766–1815), Scottish divine
 Sir Colin Buchanan (town planner) (1907–2001), British transport expert
 George Buchanan (diplomat) (1854–1924), British ambassador in Russia 1911–1919
 George Buchanan (engineer, born 1790) (died 1852), Scottish civil engineer
 George Buchanan (engineer, born 1865) (died 1940), British civil engineer
 Isaac Buchanan (1810–1883), businessman and political figure in Canada West
 James Buchanan, 1st Baron Woolavington (1849–1935), British businessman and philanthropist
 "Major" John Buchanan (1759–1832), American frontiersman, founder of present-day Nashville, Tennessee
 Mary Beth Buchanan (born 1963), United States Attorney for the Western District of Pennsylvania
 Nathaniel Buchanan (1826–1901), Australian pioneer pastoralist, drover and explorer
 Peter Buchanan (architect) (born 1942), architect, urbanist, writer, critic, lecturer and exhibition curator
 Peter Buchanan (judge) (1943–2014), Australian jurist
 Thomas Boughton Buchanan (1833–1924), Archdeacon of Wilts from 1874 until 1911
 William Buchanan (pastoralist) (1824–1911), Australian pastoralist and gold prospector

Politics
 Alan Buchanan (politician) (born 1952), Canadian university administrator and former politician
 Alick Buchanan-Smith (politician) (1932–1991), Scottish Conservative and Unionist politician
 Andrew Buchanan (American politician) (1780–1848), member of the U.S. House of Representatives from Pennsylvania
 Andrew Buchanan (New Zealand politician) (1806–1877), member of the New Zealand Legislative Council from 1862 to 1874
 Arthur S. Buchanan (1856–1919), Associate Justice of the Tennessee Supreme Court
 Bay Buchanan  (born 1948), sister to Pat Buchanan, and former Treasurer of the United States
 Cameron Buchanan (politician) (born 1946), Scottish politician
 Charles Pakenham Buchanan (1874–1924), Australian business man and mayor of Brisbane
 David Buchanan (politician) (1823–1890), barrister and politician in colonial New South Wales
 Edward Buchanan (born 1967), American politician and attorney
 Frank Buchanan (Illinois politician) (1862–1930), Democratic member of the United States House of Representatives from Illinois
 Frank Buchanan (Pennsylvania politician) (1902–1951), Democratic member of the U.S. House of Representatives from Pennsylvania
 George Buchanan (politician) (1890–1955), Scottish politician
 James Buchanan (1791–1868), 15th president of the United States of America
 James P. Buchanan (1867–1937), American politician
 Joan Buchanan (born 1952), American politician
 John Buchanan (Canadian politician) (1931-2019), Canadian politician
 John Buchanan (American politician), Republican presidential candidate in 2004
 John A. Buchanan (1843–1921), American politician and judge
 John Hall Buchanan Jr. (1928-2018), American politician
 John P. Buchanan (1847–1930), Governor of Tennessee
 Mike Buchanan (born 1957), British men's rights activist, leader of the Justice for Men and Boys party
 Pam Buchanan (1937–1992), Australian politician
 Pat Buchanan (born 1938), American political commentator and Reform Party presidential nominee in 2000
 Thomas Buchanan (1808–1841), second governor of Liberia
 Thomas Buchanan (born 1963), Unionist politician from Northern Ireland
 Thomas Ryburn Buchanan (1846–1911),  Scottish Liberal politician and bibliophile
 Vern Buchanan (born 1951), U.S. Representative from Florida
 William Buchanan (Manitoba politician), Canadian politician
 William Ashbury Buchanan (1876-1954), Canadian politician and newspaper publisher

Sport
 Aimee Buchanan (born 1993), American-born Olympic figure skater for Israel
 Archie Buchanan (1928–1983), former association football player
 Barry Buchanan (born 1968), American professional wrestler ("Bull Buchanan")
 Brian Buchanan (born 1973), Major League Baseball outfielder
 Buck Buchanan (1940–1992), American football player
 Cameron Buchanan (footballer) (1928–2008), football player
 David Buchanan (cricketer) (1830–1900), amateur cricketer, notable for spin bowling
 David Buchanan (footballer, born 1962), English professional footballer
 David Buchanan (footballer, born 1986), professional footballer
 David Buchanan (baseball) (born 1989), American professional baseball pitcher for the Philadelphia Phillies
 Henry Buchanan (born 1978), American boxer
 Izett Buchanan (born 1972), American basketball player
 Jack Buchanan (rugby league) (born 1992), Australian Rugby League player
 John Buchanan (sailor) (1884–1943), Scottish Olympic medalist in sailing
 John Buchanan (footballer, born 1935) (died 2009), Scottish footballer
 John Buchanan (footballer, born 1951), Scottish footballer 
 Kadeisha Buchanan (born 1995), Canadian soccer player
 Ken Buchanan (born 1945), Scottish boxer
 Laurence Buchanan (born 1976), English cricketer
 Michael Buchanan (American football) (born 1991), American football defensive end for the New England Patriots
 Mike Buchanan (1932–2017), Canadian former ice hockey defenceman
 Peter Buchanan (footballer, born 1915) (died 1977), Scottish footballer who played at both professional and international levels
 Peter Buchanan (rugby union) (1889–1957), rugby union player who represented Australia
 Ralph "Bucky" Buchanan (1922–2005), Canadian ice hockey right winger
 Ray Buchanan (born 1971), American football player
 Richard Buchanan (American football) (born 1969), American professional football wide receiver
 Robert Buchanan (footballer) (1868–1909), Scottish international footballer
 Robert Gordon Buchanan (born 1961), retired Major League Baseball pitcher
 Ron Buchanan (born 1944), former Canadian professional ice hockey centre
 Shamari Buchanan (born 1977), American football player
Shaq Buchanan (born 1997), American basketball player in the Israeli Basketball Premier League
 Tim Buchanan (born 1946), former American football linebacker
 William Buchanan (footballer) (1865–?), Scottish footballer

Television and film
 Buchanan family, one of the main families in the American soap opera One Life to Live
 Colin Buchanan (actor) (born 1966), Scottish actor
 Edgar Buchanan (1903–1979), American actor
 Gordon Buchanan (born 1972), Scottish wildlife film maker
 Ian Buchanan (born 1957), Scottish television actor
 Jack Buchanan (1891–1957), Scottish actor and singer
 Jensen Buchanan (born 1962), American actress
 Lachlan Buchanan (born 1987), Australian actor
 Larry Buchanan (1923–2004), film director, producer and writer
 Luciane Buchanan (born 1993), New Zealand actress
 Neil Buchanan (born 1956), British television presenter
 Neville Buchanan (born 1959), British animator and director
 Simone Buchanan (born 1968), Australian actress
 Stuart Buchanan (1894–1974), American voice actor starring in Snow White and the Seven Dwarfs playing the role of Humbert the Huntsman
 Tanner Buchanan (born 1998), American actor

Buchanan peerages
Marquess of Graham and Buchanan
Buchanan baronets, of Dunburgh
Buchanan baronets, of Lavington

Fictional characters
 Pete Buchanan, fictional character from the British soap opera Hollyoaks
 Princess Buchanan, fictional character from the British soap opera Doctors

See also
Buchanon, surname
 Mitch Buchannon

Surnames of Scottish origin